Sablé may refer to:

Sablé (biscuit), a shortbread cookie
Sablé-sur-Sarthe, France
Sablé FC (France), French football club
Julien Sablé, French footballer
Victor Sablé, French politician